Keeping in Touch is the eleventh studio album by Canadian country pop artist Anne Murray, released in 1976.  In the U.S., the album peaked at number 26 on the country album charts and number 96 on the pop albums chart, and in Canada, the album peaked at number 64 on the RPM album chart on 10 December 1976.

Track listing

References

1974 albums
Anne Murray albums
Capitol Records albums
Albums produced by Tom Catalano